The Latvian Performers' and Producers' Association (LaIPA) is a National ISRC Agency of the International Federation of the Phonographic Industry with the task of representing the Latvian music industry for both national and international recording artists of all genres. Goals of the organisation are supporting Latvian artists and producers and promote development of Latvian music industry and export of music produced in Latvia, to promote and support creation of competitive music records and increase utilization of Latvian music by educating Latvian performers and producers, to officially represent Latvian music industry in Europe and international showcases, fairs and exhibitions, and to educate members of Latvian music industry about the issues of music export and global trends. The company also certifies albums and music videos based on unit sales and compiles the country's music chart.

Certification awards

Albums

Videos

References

IFPI members
Music organisations based in Latvia